Silai may refer to:

Šilai (disambiguation), various villages in Lithuania
Silai Temple, a place of the Silai Temple Incident
Ileana Silai, a Romanian middle-distance runner
Shilabati River